"Who Do You Love Now?" is a song performed by Australian singer Dannii Minogue and Dutch DJs Zki & Dobre, performing under the group name Riva. The track began originally as an instrumental-only called "Stringer", which soon became a club hit. The record was released on 19 November 2001 through the Double F Double R label. It was later adapted into a vocal version for Dannii Minogue, written by Victoria Horn. For the Canadian market, Minogue recorded a French-language version of the song called "Est-ce que tu m'aimes encore?". The single was cancelled in Canada but was later released in France as the B-side to "I Begin to Wonder". Initially released as a stand-alone single, the song was later included on Minogue's 2003 album Neon Nights.

"Who Do You Love Now?" was produced by Riva and reached number three in the United Kingdom and remaining on the charts for 15 weeks—Minogue's longest stay on the UK Singles Chart for any of her singles. It reached the top 20 in Australia and Canada and the top 30 in Sweden. In the United States, "Who Do You Love Now?" was successful on the Billboard dance charts, where it reached the top position on the Dance Club Play chart. "Who Do You Love Now?" also received a New Zealand release and had solid airplay on radio by the request of fans. The single was also played heavily in gay clubs around Australia, New Zealand and Europe. The song marked a turning point for Minogue, who was once again going through contractual changes, and was a bridging point between her previous work and the then upcoming Neon Nights album. The single would be the first of a string of consecutive Top 20 hits in her home country, Australia, and the United Kingdom.

Formats and track listings

Australian CD single
 "Who Do You Love Now? (Stringer)" (radio version) – 3:26
 "Who Do You Love Now? (Stringer)" (Monoboy remix) – 6:53
 "Who Do You Love Now? (Stringer)" (Larry Lush Ambient remix) – 7:14

UK CD single
 "Who Do You Love Now? (Stringer)" (radio version) – 3:26
 "Who Do You Love Now? (Stringer)" (Monoboy remix) – 6:53
 "Who Do You Love Now? (Stringer)" (Larry Lush Ambient remix) – 7:14
 "Who Do You Love Now? (Stringer)" (enhanced CD-ROM video) – 3:25

UK 12-inch single
A1. "Who Do You Love Now? (Stringer)" (extended vocal version) – 5:10
B1. "Stringer" (original mix) – 6:26
B2. "Stringer" (Tall Paul remix) – 7:16

UK cassette single and European CD single
 "Who Do You Love Now? (Stringer)" (radio version) – 3:26
 "Who Do You Love Now? (Stringer)" (Monoboy remix) – 6:53

Dutch CD single
 "Who Do You Love Now? (Stringer)" (radio edit) – 3:26
 "Who Do You Love Now? (Stringer)" (extended vocal version) – 5:10

German 12-inch single
A1. "Who Do You Love Now? (Stringer)" (Future Breeze remix club) – 8:45
A2. "Who Do You Love Now? (Stringer)" (Future Breeze remix instrumental) – 8:45
B1. "Who Do You Love Now? (Stringer)" (John Johnson remix) – 9:36
B2. "Who Do You Love Now? (Stringer)" (John Johnson instrumental) – 9:36

Charts

Weekly charts

Year-end charts

Release history

References

2001 singles
2001 songs
Dannii Minogue songs
FFRR Records singles
Songs written by Victoria Horn
Zki & Dobre songs
Songs about heartache